The FIBA EuroBasket Division B was the second-ranked tier of the bi-annual FIBA EuroBasket competition. All the teams of this tournament qualified for the FIBA EuroBasket 2013 qualification. 

This was the last FIBA EuroBasket Division B tournament played.

Group Phase

Group A

Group B

Group C

Statistical Leaders 

Points

Rebounds

Assists

External links 
 Results and news from FIBA Europe website

2011
FIBA EuroBasket 2011
2010–11 in European basketball
2011–12 in European basketball